Ovomucin is a glycoprotein found mainly in egg whites, as well as in the chalaza and vitelline membrane. The protein makes up around 2-4% of the protein content of egg whites; like other members of the mucin protein family, ovomucin confers gel-like properties. It is composed of two subunits, alpha-ovomucin (MUC5B) and beta-ovomucin (MUC6), of which the beta subunit is much more heavily glycosylated.

External links

References 

Eggs
Mucins
Avian proteins